Mark James Howard (born 29 January 1986) is an English football coach and former player. He works as an assistant coach for American club Oklahoma City Energy, for whom he played for a season before retiring from playing.

Career
Born in Salford, Greater Manchester, Howard attended Hope High School, Salford, with fellow Manchester United players Phil Bardsley and Mark Redshaw. Howard began his career playing for the Barr Hill Lads Club in Salford. He signed for Manchester United as a junior player, and played a number of years in the youth and reserve teams of the club. Having failed to make an impact in the first team, Howard was amongst seven United players given a free transfer at the end of the 2005–06 season.

Howard moved to Danish Superliga champions Brøndby IF, that had recently hired Manchester United reserve team coach René Meulensteen as manager. Howard participated in training sessions and played a friendly match against German team 1. FC Nürnberg, before signing a three-year contract with Brøndby on 28 July 2006. He made his senior debut for Brøndby in August 2006, and played 13 of 18 league games as Brøndby finished in seventh place after the first half of the 2006–07 Superliga season.

When Meulensteen left the club in January 2007, new manager Tom Køhlert brought in Danish defender Mikkel Bischoff in contention for Howard's place in the central defence. When Bischoff suffered an injury, Howard proved himself once again and continued in the starting 11 for the rest of the season. He was also a part of the Brøndby team which won the 2006–07 Royal League cup on 15 March 2007. In the final match of the cup, Howard received a penalty kick, which Martin Ericsson converted to a goal, securing Brøndby a 1–0 win over F.C. Copenhagen.

Having secured his place in the starting eleven during the first half of the 2007–08 season, Howard was awarded the player of the year in Brøndby on 1 December 2007. On 10 December 2008, he signed a three and a half year contract with AGF.

Howard signed with the Oklahoma City Energy on 11 March 2014 for an undisclosed amount until the end of the year. On 29 June 2014, he scored his first goal in America and was named in the team of the week for his performances

Honours

Club
Danish Cup: 2007–08
Royal League: 2007

Individual
Brøndby Player of the Year: 2007

References

External links
 official Superliga stats 
 Howard are AGF's hottest player 
 Former Manchester United men toast Danish success

1986 births
Living people
Footballers from Salford
English footballers
Association football defenders
Manchester United F.C. players
Brøndby IF players
Aarhus Gymnastikforening players
OKC Energy FC players
Danish Superliga players
USL Championship players
English expatriate footballers
Expatriate men's footballers in Denmark
Expatriate soccer players in the United States
English expatriate sportspeople in Denmark
English expatriate sportspeople in the United States